Swallow's Juniors was a popular Australian radio and television series, which aired on 3DB (Melbourne) at 6.30 pm on a Saturday evening, from the 1950s and into the early 1960s. It was telecast from November 1957 to 1970 on Melbourne television station HSV-7. There was a period of radio/TV simulcasting before it was exclusively telecast. 

It was a talent contest featuring young performers, and was initially hosted by 3DB breakfast announcer John Eden. However Brian Naylor soon took over as compere. In 1964, the title was changed to Brian and the Juniors.

The series was one of several talent shows broadcast on HSV-7 during 1957, the others including Stairway to the Stars (1956-1958) and Swallows Parade (1957). Under the Swallow's Juniors title, it was one of several Australian television series of the 1950s to feature the sponsor's name in the title. Others included The Dulux Show, The Astor Show, Astor Showcase, and The Pressure Pak Show.

The concept of a variety program featuring a junior cast was revisited with Young Talent Time in 1971 on Network Ten which also featured some former Juniors cast members including Debbie Byrne, Jane Scali and Jamie Redfern.

See also
 Young Talent Time

References

External links

Seven Network original programming
1957 Australian television series debuts
1970 Australian television series endings
1960s Australian television series
Black-and-white Australian television shows
English-language television shows
Australian variety television shows